Baker Township is a township in Lafayette County, Arkansas, United States. Its total population was 1,975 as of the 2010 United States Census, a decrease of 19.81 percent from 2,463 at the 2000 census.

According to the 2010 Census, Baker Township is located at  (33.390496, -93.506591).

Most of the city of Stamps is located within the township.

References

External links 

Townships in Arkansas
Populated places in Lafayette County, Arkansas